Criorhina crioarctos is a species of hoverfly in the family Syrphidae.

Distribution
Myanmar.

References

Eristalinae
Diptera of Asia
Insects described in 1944
Taxa named by Frank Montgomery Hull